The 2013 Super Coppa Sammarinese is the second Super Coppa Sammarinese football match. It was contested by Tre Penne, the winner of the 2012–13 Campionato Sammarinese di Calcio, and La Fiorita the winner of the 2012–13 Coppa Titano. The match was held on 31 August 2013 at the Campo di Fiorentino.

Match details

Super Coppa Sammarinese
3